The Airborne T-Lite is an Australian ultralight trike, designed and produced by Airborne Windsports of Redhead, New South Wales. The aircraft is supplied as a complete ready-to-fly-aircraft.

Design and development
The T-Lite was designed as both a cross country powered aircraft and self-launching motor glider for soaring. The aircraft was designed to comply with the Fédération Aéronautique Internationale microlight category as well as the US FAR 103 Ultralight Vehicles rules. It features a cable-braced hang glider-style high-wing, weight-shift controls, a single-seat open cockpit, tricycle landing gear and a single engine in pusher configuration.

The aircraft is made from bolted-together aluminum tubing, with its double surface Airborne Core wing covered in Dacron sailcloth, with the top surface finished in mylar PX cloth. The  span Core wing is supported by a single tube-type kingpost and uses an "A" frame weight-shift control bar. The powerplant is a purpose-designed, single cylinder, air-cooled, four-stroke,  Bailey B200 engine, with electric starting and a 3.2:1 reduction drive.

The T-Lite is designed to be quickly disassembled for ground transport. The  fuel tank is located behind the pilot's seat and can be disconnected quickly to allow transporting it independently of the aircraft for refueling.

Specifications (T-Lite)

References

External links

2000s Australian sport aircraft
2000s Australian ultralight aircraft
Homebuilt aircraft
Single-engined pusher aircraft
Ultralight trikes